The Eugene Emeralds (nicknamed the Ems) are a Minor League Baseball team in the northwest United States, based in Eugene, Oregon. The Emeralds are members of the Northwest League and are affiliated with the San Francisco Giants. Eugene plays their home games at PK Park.

History
Founded  in 1955 as a charter member of the Northwest League, the Emeralds were named in a contest, won in January by 11-year-old Bowen Blair. They won the inaugural pennant as an independent, and remained in the NWL for fourteen seasons, through 1968. The Emeralds were the first minor-league team to play in Eugene since the disbanding of the Eugene Larks, who played at Bethel Park for just two seasons, 1950 and 1951.

The Emeralds played in northwest Eugene in 4,000-seat Bethel Park, at Roosevelt Boulevard and Maple Street, later torn down for the construction of a highway that wasn't built. In 1950 and 1951, Bethel Park was the home of the Eugene Larks of the Class D Far West League; its outfield is present-day Lark Park. Its final game in 1968 on August 29 drew 897 fans for a one-hitter and a 7-0 Emeralds win. The NWL changed to a short season league in 1966, and that season opened in Eugene against the Lewiston Broncs. The second pick in the 1966 MLB draft, future hall of famer Reggie Jackson played his first professional games at Bethel Park, as a 20-year-old center fielder, following his sophomore season at Arizona State. Hitless in the opener, the next game he got his first pro hit, a single in the first, and later a home run to right field in the ninth. He was with the Broncs for less than two weeks, then went to Modesto in the California League.

In the 1969 season, the Emeralds were promoted to AAA status in the Pacific Coast League (PCL) as the primary affiliate of the Philadelphia Phillies. The Ems returned to the Northwest League five years later when the PCL moved the AAA team to Sacramento for the 1974 season, while the Phillies moved their AAA farm team to the Toledo Mud Hens of the International League. Eugene was an independent/co-op team (Phillies, San Francisco Giants) in 1974, then became an affiliate of the Cincinnati Reds in 1975.

Entering Triple-A in 1969, the Emeralds moved from Bethel Park to Civic Stadium. The 6,800-seat facility was owned by the Eugene School District and was built in 1938 as a venue for high school football, which was played there until 1968. Civic Stadium also hosted semi-pro baseball teams, sponsored by local timber companies, until Bethel Park was built in 1950. Facing an outdated stadium and high-maintenance costs, in 2010 the Eugene Emeralds moved into PK Park, the new baseball stadium across town that was built by the University of Oregon. The Emeralds new home, PK Park, is adjacent to Autzen Stadium and near the Willamette River. They share the new facility with the Oregon Ducks collegiate baseball team, whose regular season ends in May. This left an antiquated Civic Stadium without any active tenants. A vacant Civic Stadium was destroyed by arson in 2015.

In 2009, playing for the Emeralds, Nate Freiman led the league for the season in RBIs (68), extra-base hits (33) and total bases (140).

A new logo, based upon Sasquatch, was adopted by the Emeralds in 2012. In 2013, the Emeralds partnered with Voodoo Doughnut to offer a bacon maple bratwurst as a specialty food item. Following the 2014 season, the Emeralds switched from being an affiliate of the San Diego Padres to the Chicago Cubs, who signed Eugene to a two-year deal through 2016. The player development contract was extended through the 2018 season on June 14, 2016.

In 2016, the Emeralds were awarded two "Golden Bobbleheads" for Minor League Baseball's Best Community Promotion and Best Overall Promotion. The awards were due to their work with Children's Miracle Network and their honorary player that year, Hayden Kumle.

The Emeralds won the NWL title in 2018 despite finishing , last in the overall standings. They clinched a wild card playoff spot with a  record in the second half, second behind Hillsboro, who had finished first in both halves. The Emeralds proceeded to sweep both Hillsboro and Spokane in the postseason en route to the title. Dubbed the "Bad News Ems," the .408 regular season winning percentage was the worst ever for a NWL champion. Following that season, the Emeralds were awarded the 53rd Annual Larry MacPhail Award, this award is in recognition for the franchises top promotional effort.

Due to the COVID-19 pandemic, the Minor League Baseball season was cancelled. In the winter of 2020 as part the reorganization of minor league baseball, Eugene received an invitation to play as the High-A affiliate of San Francisco Giants. In a further change, they were organized into the High-A West along with five other teams previously of the Northwest League. Eugene ended the 2021 season in first place with a 69–50 record. They then defeated the Spokane Indians, 3–1, to win the High-A West championship. In 2022, the High-A West became known as the Northwest League, the name historically used by the regional circuit prior to the 2021 reorganization.

In 2019, the Emeralds unveiled their "Monarcas de Eugene" on-field identity as part of minor league baseball's "Copa de Diversion."

The Emeralds have begun the process of looking for a new stadium to compete in. Due to the promotion to the High-A level as well as a longer season of baseball, PK Park has no longer become an option to play in. Team officials have begun discussing with Lane County officials about looking at the feasibility of constructing a new stadium located at the Lane Events Center.

Playoffs
1974: Defeated Bellingham 2–1 to win league championship.
1975: Defeated Portland 2–0 to win league championship.
1979: Lost to Grays Harbor 1–0 in finals.
1980: Declared co-champion with Bellingham.
1985: Lost to Everett 1–0 in finals.
1986: Lost to Bellingham 1–0 in finals.
1996: Lost to Yakima 2–0 in finals.
2000: Lost to Yakima 3–2 in finals.
2011: Lost to Vancouver 2–1 in semifinals.
2016: Defeated Hillsboro 2–1 in semifinals; defeated Everett 2–1 to win league championship.
2017: Defeated Hillsboro 2–0 in semifinals; Lost to Vancouver 3–1 in finals.
2018: Defeated Hillsboro 2–0 in semifinals; defeated Spokane 3–0 to win league championship.
2021: Defeated Spokane 3–1 to win league championship.
2022: Defeated Vancouver 3-0 to win league championship.

Notable alumni

Hall of Fame alumni
Jim Bunning (1973, MGR) Inducted, 1996
Mike Schmidt (1972) Inducted, 1995 

Notable alumni
Jesús Alou (1961)
Adbert Alzolay (2015)
Rubén Amaro (1971) 1964 Gold Glove
Matt Andriese (2011)
Kevin Appier (1987) MLB All-Star
Jason Bartlett (2001) 2009 AL All-Star
Anthony Bass (2008)
Bob Boone (1972) 4 x MLB All-Star
Larry Bowa (1969) 5 x MLB All-Star; 2001 NL Manager of the Year
Tim Byrdak (1994)
José Cardenal (1961)
Lance Carter (1994) 2003 AL All-Star
Dylan Cease (2016)
Bruce Chen (1996)
Adam Cimber (2013)
Franchy Cordero (2014)
Juan Cruz (1999)
Eric Davis (1980–1981) 2 x MLB All-Star
Mark DeRosa (1996)
Rob Dibble (1983) 2 x MLB All-Star, 1990 NLCS MVP
Alex Dickerson (2014)
Dick Dietz (1962)
Denny Doyle (1969)
 Scott Effross (2015)
Logan Forsythe (2008)
David Freese (2006) MLB All-Star; 2011 World Series Most Valuable Player
Nate Freiman (2009)
Oscar Gamble (1970–72)
Trent Giambrone (2016)  
Tom Gordon (1987) 3 x MLB All-Star
Trevor Gott (2013)
Khalil Greene  (2002)
Tayron Guerrero (2013)
Jedd Gyorko (2010)
Shane Halter (1991)
Bob Hamelin (1988) 1994 AL Rookie of the Year
Ian Happ (2015)
Chase Headley (2005)
Austin Hedges (2011)
Greg Hibbard (1986)
Larry Hisle (1971) 2 x MLB All-Star
Nico Hoerner (2018)
Jay Howell (1976) 3x All Star 1988 World Series
Nick Hundley (2005)
Grant Jackson (1964)
Eloy Jimenez (2015) 2020 Silver Slugger 
Brandon Kintzler (2004-2005)
Corey Kluber (2007) 2 x MLB Cy Young Award & 3 x All-Star
Mat Latos (2007-2008)
Wade LeBlanc (2006)
Charlie Leibrandt (1978)
Jon Lieber (1992) 2001 NL All-Star
Jose Lobaton (2004-2005)
Marco Luciano (2021-2022) 
Greg Luzinski (1971) 4 x MLB All-Star
Vimael Machin (2015-2016)
Mike Marshall (1965) 1974 NL Cy Young Award
Brailyn Márquez (2018) 
Brian McRae (1986) 
Miles Mikolas (2009) 2018 MLB All-Star
Dave Miley (1981)
Willie Montañez (1970) MLB All-Star
Christopher Morel (2018) 
Mélido Pérez (1985)
Odális Pérez (1995) 2002 NL All-Star
Jace Peterson (2011)
Kevin Quackenbush (2011)
Joe Randa (1991)
Horacio Ramirez (1998) 
Hunter Renfroe (2013)
Franmil Reyes (2013)
Bill Robinson (1972) 1979 World Series Champion 
John Rocker (1995)
Manuel Rodriguez (2017) 
Larry Rothschild (1975)
Jeff Russell (1980) 2 x MLB All-Star
Zack Short (2006) 
Eric Sogard (2007)
Mario Soto (1975) 3 x MLB All-Star
Cory Spangenberg (2014)
Justin Steele (2015)
Mike Sweeney (1992–1993) 5 x MLB All-Star
Andre Thornton (1968) 2 x MLB All-Star)
Keegan Thompson (2017) 
Trea Turner (2014) 2021 All-Star & NL Batting Champion, 2019 World Series Champion
Will Venable (2005)
Nick Vincent (2007)

See also
Eugene Emeralds players (1955–present)
Eugene Larks players (1950–1951)

Roster

References

External links
 
 Statistics from Baseball-Reference

Baseball teams established in 1955
Defunct Pacific Coast League teams
Sports in Eugene, Oregon
San Francisco Giants minor league affiliates
Chicago Cubs minor league affiliates
San Diego Padres minor league affiliates
Philadelphia Phillies minor league affiliates
1955 establishments in Oregon
Northwest League teams
Professional baseball teams in Oregon
High-A West teams